Finland competed at the 1920 Summer Olympics in Antwerp, Belgium for the first time as a fully independent state. It did compete at the previous Olympics, however, only as the Russian-dependent Grand Duchy of Finland. 63 competitors, 62 men and 1 woman, took part in 51 events in 9 sports.

Medalists

Gold
Athletics
Men's 10000 m:  Paavo Nurmi
Men's cross country individual:  Paavo Nurmi
Men's cross country team:  Frederick Teudor Koskenniemi, Heikki Liimatainen, Paavo Nurmi
Men's discus throw:  Elmer Konstantin Niklander
Men's javelin throw:  Jonni Myyrä
Men's marathon:  Hannes Kolehmainen
Men's pentathlon:  Eero Reino Lehtonen
Men's shot put:  Frans Wilhelmi Pörhölä
Men's triple jump:  Vilho Immanuel Tuulos
Figure skating (on ice)
Mixed pairs:  Ludowika Jakobsson, Walter Jakobsson
Wrestling
Men's freestyle 60–67.5 kg (lightweight):  Kalle Anttila
Men's freestyle 67.5–75 kg (middleweight):  Eino Aukusti Leino
Men's Greco-Roman +82 kg (super heavyweight):  Adolf Valentin Lindfors
Men's Greco-Roman -60 kg (featherweight):  Oskar David Friman
Men's Greco-Roman 60–67.5 kg (lightweight):  Eemil Ernesti Väre

Silver
Athletics
Men's 5000 m:  Paavo Nurmi
Men's discus throw:  Armas Rudolf Taipale
Men's javelin throw:  Urho Pellervo Peltonen
Men's shot put:  Elmer Konstantin Niklander
Shooting
Men's team, 100 m running deer, single shot:  Yrjö Kolho, Kaarlo Kustaa Lappalainen, Robert Tikkanen, Nestori Toivonen,  Magnus Wegelius
Wrestling
Men's freestyle 67.5–75 kg (middleweight):  Väinö Penttala
Men's Greco-Roman -60 kg (featherweight):  Heikki Kähkönen
Men's Greco-Roman 60–67.5 kg (lightweight):  Taavi Tamminen
Men's Greco-Roman 67.5–75 kg (middleweight):  Arthur Lindfors
Men's Greco-Roman 75–82 kg (light-heavyweight):  Edil Rosenqvist

Bronze
Athletics
Men's cross country individual:  Heikki Liimatainen
Men's javelin throw:  Paavo Jaale-Johansson
Men's pentathlon: Hugo Jalmari Lahtinen
Shooting
Men's team, 100 m running deer, double shots:  Yrjö Kolho, Robert Tikkanen, Nestori Toivonen, Vilho Vauhkonen, Magnus Wegelius
Men's team 300 m free rifle, prone:  Voitto Waldemar Kolho, Kaarlo Kustaa Lappalainen, Veli Nieminen, Vilho Vauhkonen, Magnus Wegelius
Swimming
Men's 200 m breaststroke:  Arvo Ossian Aaltonen
Men's 400 m breaststroke:  Arvo Ossian Aaltonen
Wrestling
Men's Greco-Roman + 82 kg (super heavyweight):  Martti Nieminen
Men's Greco-Roman 67.5–75 kg (middleweight):  Matti Perttilä

Aquatics

Diving

Three divers, all men, represented Finland in 1920. It was the nation's third appearance in the sport. Valkama was the only diver to advance to a final, placing fifth in the plain high diving. This result matched Finland's best diving result to date.

 Men

Ranks given are within the semifinal group.

Swimming

A single swimmer represented Finland in 1920. It was the nation's third appearance in the sport as well as the Olympics. Aaltonen won bronze medals in both of his breaststroke events. They were Finland's first Olympic swimming medals; Aaltonen had been the first Finn to advance to a swimming event final.

Ranks given are within the heat.

 Men

Athletics

26 athletes represented Finland in 1920. It was the nation's third appearance in athletics, a sport in which Finland had competed each time the country appeared at the Olympics. The Finnish team garnered nine gold medals, matching the United States for the most in that category. With only about a quarter of the number of athletes, however, the Finns could not match the depth of the United States and finished with 13 fewer total medals.

The Finland team's greatest successes came in long distance running events (gold medals in the 10,000 metres, marathon, individual cross country, and team cross country) and throwing events (golds in the discus throw, shot put, and javelin throw—sweeping the medals in the latter). They also took the championships in the triple jump and the pentathlon.

Ranks given are within the heat.

Equestrian

A single equestrian represented Finland in 1920. It was the nation's debut in the sport. Wilkman competed in the eventing competition, placing 17th.

Modern pentathlon

Two pentathletes represented Finland in 1920. It was the nation's debut in the sport.

A point-for-place system was used, with the lowest total score winning.

Skating

Figure skating

Three figure skaters represented Finland in 1920. It was the nation's debut in the sport. The Jakobssons, a married couple, won the pairs competition. Ilmanen placed fifth of nine in the men's singles.

Shooting

Nine shooters represented Finland in 1920. It was the nation's third appearance in the sport as well as the Olympics. The Finns were looking to improve upon the pair of bronze medals they had won in 1912, which was the country's best result to date. They were successful, taking a silver medal in the team running deer single shots competition as well as another pair of bronzes in other team competitions.

Weightlifting

A single weightlifter represented Finland in 1920. It was the nation's debut in the sport. Ekström competed in the light heavyweight category, but did not finish the competition.

Wrestling

Eighteen wrestlers competed for Finland in 1920. It was the nation's third appearance in the sport as well as the Olympics. The Finland team was the most successful of any country, taking fully half of the gold medals as well as twice as many total medals as any other country. Twelve of the eighteen wrestlers won medals.

Nine of the ten Greco-Roman wrestlers won medals, including three gold medals. The Finns swept the top two places in two of the five events, won two medals in two other events, and took one medal in the fifth. The Finnish wrestlers won 84% of their matches, a percentage that rises to 89% when matches between two men from Finland are excluded.

The eight freestyle wrestlers were also successful, taking two of a possible five gold medals, but not to the extent of the Greco-Roman wrestlers. Only three of the eight took medals, and the winning percentage was a less-staggering though still respectable 70%.

Freestyle

Greco-Roman

References

External links

International Olympic Committee results database
 
 

Nations at the 1920 Summer Olympics
1920
Olympics